Little Manly is the name of two places:

Little Manly Cove, a suburb of Sydney, Australia
Little Manly, New Zealand is a suburb on the Whangaparaoa Peninsula north of Auckland, New Zealand